Madeenathul Uloom Arabic College  is a college affiliated to University of Calicut located at Pulikkal, in Malappuram district, Kerala.
The college is offering afzal ul ulama preliminary, BA (Afzal ul Ulama) and MA in Arabic.

Academic

The college offers 2 years  Afzal ul ulama preliminary,  a three-year B.A Afzal ul ulama course and a two-year M.A  (Post Afzal ul ulama) course.

Location

Pulikkal, Malppuram, Kerala

See also

References

External links
University of Calicut
University Grants Commission
National Assessment and Accreditation Council

Colleges in Kerala
Universities and colleges in Malappuram district
Educational institutions established in 1946
1946 establishments in India
Academic institutions formerly affiliated with the University of Madras